Echt-Susteren is a municipality in the southeastern Netherlands. Echt-Susteren was created in 2003 by merging the former municipalities of Echt and Susteren.

Echt-Susteren is situated in a Euregional area. In the west the municipality borders to Belgium and in the east to Germany. The narrowest is only 4.8 km wide. It is possible to walk from Germany to Belgium via Netherlands in under an hour. The area of Echt-Susteren is a green municipality also known as the green waist of Limburg.

Population centres
Aasterberg, Baakhoven, Berkelaar, Dieteren, Echt, Echterbosch, Gebroek, Heide, Hingen, Illikhoven, Kokkelert, Koningsbosch, Maria-Hoop, Nieuwstadt, Oevereind, Ophoven, Oud-Roosteren, Pey, Pepinusbrug, Roosteren, Schilberg, Sint Joost, Slek, Susteren, Visserweert.

Echt

Echt is a former municipality. It received city rights in 1343.

Susteren

Susteren is a former municipality. It received city rights in 1276.

Maria-Hoop
Maria-Hoop is a small village in the neighbourhood of the hamlets Echterbosch and Putbroek and the village Koningsbosch. Originally named Diergaarde, the village's named was changed to Maria-Hoop in 1953, after the local church Moeder der H. Hoop.

Roosteren
The name of the village of Roosteren (population circa 1600, including Kokkelert and Oevereind) was derived from a combination of the Rode Beek (Red Brook) and the town of Suestra (Susteren) leading to the name Roosteren. The village has two 'castles', the Castle Ter Boch and the Castle Eyckholt and a number of Lord Manors. It is located in between the river Meuse (Maas) and the Juliana Canal (Julianakanaal) with a small part of the village separated from the main population centre by the canal: Oud Roosteren (Old Roosteren). The main church is located in Roosteren whereas the cemetery is located near the site of the former church in Old Roosteren.

Topography

Dutch Topographic map of the municipality of Echt-Susteren, June 2015

Notable people 

 Edith Stein (1891–1942) German Jewish philosopher who converted to Catholicism and became a nun. She is canonized as a martyr and saint of the Catholic Church. Lived in Echt
 Emeri Johannes van Donzel (1925 in Nieuwstadt − 2017) historian of the Middle East, particularly Ethiopia
 Frans Wackers (born 1939 in Echt) medical doctor, research scientist into nuclear cardiology
 Ria Oomen-Ruijten (born 1950 in St Joost) politician
 Ien Lucas (born 1955 in Echt) visual artist of abstract paintings on canvas or wood 
 Adrian van Hooydonk (born 1964 in Echt) automobile designer, BMW Group's Design Director
 Roland van Vliet (born 1969 in Susteren) independent politician
 Laurence Stassen (born 1971 in Sittard) independent politician, former freelance TV presenter

Sport 
 Martin van der Borgh (1934 in Koningsbosch – 2018) racing cyclist
 Jan Schröder (1941 in Koningsbosch – 2007) professional road and track cyclist. 
 Sef Vergoossen (born 1947 in Echt) former football manager
 Demi Schuurs (born 1993 in Nieuwstadt) professional tennis player
 Perr Schuurs (born 1999 in Nieuwstadt) professional footballer

Gallery

References

External links

Official website

 
Belgium–Netherlands border crossings
Germany–Netherlands border crossings
Municipalities of Limburg (Netherlands)
Municipalities of the Netherlands established in 2003